The 2001 WNBA season was the fifth season for the Houston Comets. The team advanced to the WNBA Playoffs, but failed to win a fifth consecutive championship.

Offseason

WNBA Draft

Regular season

Season standings

Season schedule

Player stats

References

Houston Comets seasons
Houston
Houston